Boutique Design magazine is a trade publication produced by ST Media Group International. As the only hospitality interiors magazine that focuses specifically on boutique hospitality, Boutique Design (BD) is the authority on the boutique hotel, spa and restaurant market. About designers and for designers, BD features major hospitality projects, industry news and products which are relevant to the industry in each of its bi-monthly issues. The publication debuted in spring, 2005. 

BD also produces Boutique Design New York (BDNY), a hospitality interiors show that runs concurrently with the International Hotel, Motel + Restaurant Show at the Javits Center in New York. Over 750 exhibitors representing high-end, unique and innovative design products—including furniture, lighting, wall coverings, fabric, seating, accessories, artwork, carpet and flooring, materials, bath and spa – are presented in small-scale displays, creating an intimate, boutique-style shopping environment. 

The event also includes education sessions, presented by BD and its sister publication Hospitality Style; design forums; special show floor exhibits; and the presentation of the annual Boutique Design Awards.  

Each spring, Boutique Design  names a list of up-and-coming hospitality interior designers known as The Boutique 18.

References

External links
Boutique Design
Hospitality Style
Boutique Design New York

2005 establishments in Ohio
Visual arts magazines published in the United States
Bimonthly magazines published in the United States
Design magazines
Magazines established in 2005
Magazines published in Cincinnati